Benjamin R. Ostrander (November 1843 – December 14, 1922) was an American politician in the state of Washington. He served in the Washington House of Representatives from 1889 to 1891.

References

Republican Party members of the Washington House of Representatives
1843 births
1922 deaths